is the President of Miyagi University of Education.

Biographical
1943- Takahashi was born in Akita Prefecture

1975- Received credits from working towards his PhD in Oriental History from Tokyo University Graduate School
In the same year he left Tokyo University to become assistant professor of MUE.

1988- Became a professor at MUE

1996- Became the Dean of MUE

1999- Became the President of the Associate Elementary School

2003- Became the Vice President of MUE

2006- Became the president of MUE

Specialization: Chinese Modern/Contemporary History

Latest Publication: 'Social History of Famine and Relief'

References 

20th-century Japanese historians
Living people
University of Tokyo alumni
Year of birth missing (living people)
21st-century Japanese historians